Gary Lewis Gulman (born July 17, 1970) is an American stand-up comedian. He was a finalist on the NBC reality-talent show Last Comic Standing in its second and third seasons. He released his first CD, Conversations With Inanimate Objects in 2005, and his first television special Gary Gulman: Boyish Man the following year. Since then, he has released two other comedy albums and three other comedy specials, including 2019's The Great Depresh on HBO.

Early life 
Gary Lewis Gulman was born on July 17, 1970, in Peabody, Massachusetts, to Barbara and Philip Gulman. He is the youngest of three brothers, and was raised in a Jewish family. Gulman's parents divorced before he was two years old and his family struggled financially.

Gulman has described himself as a sensitive kid who enjoyed making his friends laugh, drawing and painting, and playing basketball. He attended Peabody Veterans Memorial High School. After his junior year of high school, he was recruited to play football.

Gulman attended Boston College on a football scholarship. He played tight end during his freshman year but later left the team. Gulman credits the time he spent playing football in college as one of the main reasons he recognized and began to seek help for his lifelong struggle with depression and for his later pursuit of a career in comedy. Gulman graduated in 1993 with a degree in accounting, planning to become a CPA like one of his brothers.

After graduating, he worked for two years as an accountant at the Big Six accounting firm Coopers & Lybrand (now PricewaterhouseCoopers), while going to comedy club open mics at night. He then began working as a substitute teacher, where he was well known for trying out his stand-up routines on high-school students before bringing them to the stage at night.

Career 
Gulman's comedy centers on absurd observations about daily occurrences. He is one of only a handful of comedians to appear on every major late-night television comedy program, having performed on The Tonight Show with Jay Leno, Late Show with David Letterman, The Late Show with Stephen Colbert, The Late Late Show with Craig Ferguson, Jimmy Kimmel Live!, Conan, Late Night with Seth Meyers, Just for Laughs, and John Oliver's New York Stand-Up Show.

On November 25, 2006, Gary Gulman starred in his own one-hour Comedy Central special entitled Gary Gulman: Boyish Man. His second Comedy Central special aired on December 8, 2012, called In This Economy?, followed by It’s About Time in 2016 on Netflix and The Great Depresh in 2019 on HBO.

1993 – 2003: Early career 
Gulman began performing at open mics in 1993 in the Boston area. In early 1999, Gulman began to pursue stand-up full time; he moved from his family home in Peabody to Los Angeles where he had received development deals. He worked on developing five different shows during this time but none of them were picked up by a television network.

Gulman performed his first late night stand-up set in 1999 on The Tonight Show with Jay Leno. The following year, he performed on the Late Show with David Letterman.

2003 – 2012: Touring, Last Comic Standing, and more TV appearances 
Gulman first came to national attention in 2003 when he was a contestant on the second season of the NBC reality-talent show Last Comic Standing. In season 2, he finished in third place behind John Heffron and Alonzo Bodden. Gulman was also on the third season of the show in 2004. Following Last Comic Standing, Gulman released his first comedy album Conversations with Inanimate Objects. He then appeared in Dane Cook's documentary series Tourgasm which premiered on HBO in 2006; Gulman appeared with fellow comedians Dane Cook, Jay Davis, and Robert Kelly.

Wanting to have more opportunities to perform stand-up, Gulman moved to New York City in 2006. In 2008, Gulman was the host of NESN's Comedy All-Stars. During this period, Gulman performed stand-up on The Tonight Show with Jay Leno (2005), Jimmy Kimmel Live! (2006), Last Call with Carson Daly (2006), The Late Late Show with Craig Ferguson (2007), and Conan (2011), among others shows.

2012 – 2019: Rise to national prominence 
In 2012, Gulman released a new Comedy Central special In this Economy? The show was taped in the Wilbur Theatre in Boston, Massachusetts. Following its premiere, he performed on the Late Show with David Letterman for the second time. In May 2014, Gulman had a guest appearance on Inside Amy Schumer. In April of that year he performed for the first time on Late Night with Seth Meyers and in June 2014 he was the guest on The Pete Holmes Show. He was a guest on Jimmy Pardo's podcast Never Not Funny (episode 1512) on October 23, 2014, (episode 1918) on December 8, 2016, and (episode 2325) on January 31, 2019. Pardo cited Gulman as one of the best stand-ups working today, along with Brian Regan, John Mulaney, and Maria Bamford.

In March 2015, Gulman taped his new special It's About Time. It was released the following year, in May 2016, by Netflix. During the interim time, Gulman was hospitalized for clinical depression; this was not publicly made known at the time.

In January 2017, he performed on The Late Show with Stephen Colbert. In May 2017, he was again hospitalized due to depression. In 2018, he appeared as a fictionalized version of himself on HBO's Crashing and appeared in episode four of HBO's four-part special of the 2 Dope Queens podcast with Jessica Williams and Phoebe Robinson.

During this period, Gulman was on Conan three times (2014, 2015, 2016). The last of those sets, which commented on a fake documentary on how all of the US states received their two-letter abbreviations, went viral.

2019 – present: The Great Depresh 
Since January 1, 2019, Gulman has been posting daily tips for aspiring comedians on his Twitter feed. In Fall 2019, he was interviewed on both Conan and Late Night with Seth Meyers.

Gulman recorded a HBO special in June 2019, entitled The Great Depresh. Judd Apatow served as executive producer. The special premiered on HBO on October 5, 2019, and sees Gulman opening up about his depression, anxiety and hospitalization. He has described the show as "a hybrid, where I do some documentary about my recovery, treatment, and my hospitalization, and then I do stand-up surrounding that." It includes conversations with his wife Sadé, his psychiatrist Dr. Richard Friedman, and his mother Barbara, who asked "if Judd Apatow could make her look thinner". Gulman has stated he had "retired from life" because of his crippling depression for more than two years before recovering through treatment and medication. However, he felt very anxious and sad when he got back on stage, and his way of dealing with that was to joke about it, leading to the idea for the special. Gulman credits his psychiatrist with guiding him through medication, treatment and hospitalization, which he was particularly terrified of because all he knew about it previously were the negative depictions of hospitalization like One Flew Over the Cuckoo's Nest and Girl, Interrupted. He has stated that his hospitalization actually "turned out very ordinary, and so helpful" and he hopes that sharing his experience will help to destigmatize medication and therapy.

In 2019, Gulman had a small role as a comedian in the film Joker.

Personal life 
Gary has been open about his struggle with depression and anxiety and incorporates it into his comedy.

Gulman is married to Sadé Pilot, with whom he was first seen in 2014. The two live with their dogs in Harlem in New York City.

Gulman is 6' 6" tall.

Discography 
 Conversations with Inanimate Objects (2005) (Re-released 2013)
 Gary Gulman: Boyish Man (2006) – Comedy Central special
 All I Want for Chanukah is Christmas! (2010)
 No Can Defend (2012)
In this Economy? (2012) – Comedy Central special
 It's About Time (2016) – Netflix special
The Great Depresh (2019) – HBO special

Filmography

Film

Television

References

External links
 
 
 Interview from July 2005 at comedycouch.com

American male comedians
Jewish American male comedians
Last Comic Standing contestants
Carroll School of Management alumni
Boston College Eagles football players
1970 births
Living people
People from Peabody, Massachusetts
Comedians from Massachusetts
20th-century American comedians
21st-century American comedians
21st-century American Jews